Attilio Regolo may refer to:

Marcus Atilius Regulus (d. 250 BC), Roman general
Marco Attilio Regolo, opera by Alessandro Scarlatti to libretto by Matteo Noris, Rome 1719
Attilio Regolo, 1740 libretto by Metastasio
Attilio Regolo (Hasse), first setting of the Metastasio libretto, Dresden 1750
Attilio Regolo, opera by Niccolò Jommelli, London 1753